Stefano Casertano (Milan, 1948) is an astro-physicist working at the Space Telescope Science Institute. In 2019 he resulted among the authors of a breakthrough research about the expansion of the Universe, confirming that it is "outpacing all expectations of its expansion rate".

Publications (selection)
Riess, Adam & Casertano, Stefano & Yuan, Wenlong & Bowers, J. & Macri, Lucas & Zinn, Joel & Scolnic, Dan. (2021). Cosmic Distances Calibrated to 1% Precision with Gaia EDR3 Parallaxes and Hubble Space Telescope Photometry of 75 Milky Way Cepheids Confirm Tension with ΛCDM. The Astrophysical Journal. 908. L6. 10.3847/2041-8213/abdbaf. 
Soltis, John & Casertano, Stefano & Riess, Adam. (2021). The Parallax of ω Centauri Measured from Gaia EDR3 and a Direct, Geometric Calibration of the Tip of the Red Giant Branch and the Hubble Constant. The Astrophysical Journal. 908. L5. 10.3847/2041-8213/abdbad. 
Soltis, John & Casertano, Stefano & Riess, Adam. (2020). The Parallax of Omega Centauri Measured from Gaia EDR3 and a Direct, Geometric Calibration of the Tip of the Red Giant Branch and the Hubble Constant. 
Kains, Noé & Calamida, Annalisa & Sahu, Kailash & Casertano, S. & Anderson, J. & Udalski, A. & Zoccali, Manuela & Bond, H. & Albrow, M. & Bond, Ian & Dominik, Martin & Fryer, C. & Livio, M. & Mao, Shude & Rejkuba, M.. (2017). Microlensing Constraints on the Mass of Single Stars from HST Astrometric Measurements. The Astrophysical Journal. 843. 10.3847/1538-4357/aa78eb. *Huang, Caroline & Riess, Adam & Yuan, Wenlong & Macri, Lucas & Zakamska, Nadia & Casertano, Stefano & Whitelock, Patricia & Hoffmann, Samantha & Filippenko, Alexei & Scolnic, Daniel. (2020). Hubble Space Telescope Observations of Mira Variables in the SN Ia Host NGC 1559: An Alternative Candle to Measure the Hubble Constant. The Astrophysical Journal. 889. 5. 10.3847/1538-4357/ab5dbd. 
Riess, Adam & Macri, Lucas & Hoffmann, Samantha & Scolnic, Dan & Casertano, Stefano & Filippenko, Alexei & Tucker, Brad & Reid, Mark & Jones, David & Silverman, Jeffrey & Chornock, Ryan & Challis, Peter & Yuan, Wenlong & Foley, Ryan. (2016). A 2.4% Determination of the Local Value of the Hubble Constant. The Astrophysical Journal. 826. 10.3847/0004-637X/826/1/56. 
Calamida, Annalisa & Sahu, Kailash & Anderson, J. & Casertano, S. & Cassisi, S. & Salaris, M. & Sokol, J. & Bond, H. & Ferraro, I. & Ferguson, Henry & Livio, M. & Valenti, J. & Buonanno, Raffaella & Clarkson, W. & Pietrinferni, Adriano. (2014). First Detection of the White-Dwarf Cooling Sequence of the Galactic Bulge. The Astrophysical Journal. 790. 10.1088/0004-637X/790/2/164. 
Calamida, Annalisa & Sahu, Kailash & Anderson, J. & Casertano, S. & Cassisi, S. & Salaris, M. & Sokol, J. & Bond, H. & Ferraro, I. & Ferguson, Henry & Livio, M. & Valenti, J. & Buonanno, Raffaella & Clarkson, W. & Pietrinferni, Adriano. (2014). First Detection of the White-Dwarf Cooling Sequence of the Galactic Bulge. The Astrophysical Journal. 790. 10.1088/0004-637X/790/2/164. 
Casertano, Stefano & Ratnatunga, Kavan & Griffiths, and. (2008). Cosmic Gravitational Shear from the Hubble Space Telescope Medium Deep Survey. The Astrophysical Journal Letters. 598. L71. 10.1086/380814.

References

1948 births
Living people
Italian scientists